The Braden River is a  waterway that drains an  area watershed in west-central Florida and is the largest tributary of the Manatee River.

Hydrology

The Braden River can be hydrologically divided into three distinct sections that include an  reach of naturally incised, free-flowing channel; a  reach of impounded river created by the Ward Lake reservoir and weir; and a  reach of tidal estuary.

References 

Rivers of Manatee County, Florida
Rivers of Florida